The 3rd Pan Arab Games were held in Casablanca, Morocco between 24 August and 8 September 1961. 1127 athletes from 9 countries participated in events in 11 sports.

Sports
Athletics
Basketball
Boxing
Football
Gymnastics (artistic)
Handball
Swimming
Tennis
Water polo
Weightlifting
Wrestling

Medals won by country

References

 
P
Pan Arab Games
Sport in Casablanca
Pan Arab Games
Pan Arab Games
Multi-sport events in Morocco
August 1961 sports events in Africa
September 1961 sports events in Africa